Samuel Tucker may refer to:
Samuel Tucker (golfer) (1875–??), English golfer
Samuel Tucker (naval officer) (1747–1833), American naval officer
Samuel Tucker (politician) (1721–1789), American politician
Samuel Wilbert Tucker (1913–1990), American attorney

See also
Sam Tucker (1895–1973), English rugby union footballer